Pakistan International Airlines Flight 705 (PK705) was a Boeing 720 airliner that crashed while descending to land at Cairo International Airport on 20 May 1965. Of the 127 passengers and crew on board, all but 6 were killed.

Accident

Flight 705 on 20 May 1965 was an inaugural flight between Karachi, Pakistan and London, United Kingdom and was carrying distinguished guests and journalists among the 114 passengers. The aircraft was scheduled to stop at Dhahran in Saudi Arabia, Cairo and then Geneva before completing its journey to London. As the aircraft was on final approach to Cairo International Airport, the pilot reported problems with the flaps; shortly thereafter, the aircraft crashed southeast of the airport and broke up as it exploded into flames. Six of the passengers were thrown clear of the wreckage, but everyone else on board was killed. Among the dead was the Chinese aircraft designer Huang Zhiqian, who was chief designer of the fighter jet Shenyang J-8.

Aircraft
The aircraft was a Boeing 720-040B with the registration AP-AMH and manufacturer's serial number 18379; it was first flown on 19 October 1962 and delivered to Pakistan International Airlines on 7 November 1962. At the time of the accident, the aircraft had flown 8378 hours.

Investigation
On 26 May, local police reported that a transistor radio had been found in the wreckage of the aircraft with jewellery valued at $120,000 hidden in it.

The probable cause of the crash was that "the aircraft did not maintain the adequate height for the circuit and continued to descend until it contacted the ground. The reason for that abnormal continuation of descent is unknown."

See also

 Aviation safety
 List of accidents and incidents involving commercial aircraft

Notes

References

External links 
 PIA Flight 705 on History of PIA

Aviation accidents and incidents in 1965
Airliner accidents and incidents with an unknown cause
Airliner accidents and incidents involving controlled flight into terrain
Aviation accidents and incidents in Egypt
705
1965 in Egypt
Accidents and incidents involving the Boeing 707
May 1965 events in Africa